Mother Tongue is an annual academic journal published by the Association for the Study of Language in Prehistory (ASLIP) that has been published since 1995. Its goal is to encourage international and interdisciplinary information sharing, discussion, and debate among geneticists, paleoanthropologists, archaeologists, and historical linguists on questions relating to the origin of language and ancestral human spoken languages. This includes, but is not limited to, discussion of linguistic macrofamily hypotheses.

See also
Journal of Language Relationship

References

External links
 Website

Historical linguistics journals
Annual journals
Paleolinguistics
Publications established in 1995
English-language journals
Publications disestablished in 2005
Paleoanthropology